Josef Jelínek (27 March 1902 – 10 January 1973) was a Czech footballer. He competed for Czechoslovakia in the men's tournament at the 1924 Summer Olympics. At a club level, he played for FK Viktoria Žižkov.

References

External links
 

1902 births
1973 deaths
Czech footballers
Czechoslovak footballers
Czechoslovakia international footballers
Olympic footballers of Czechoslovakia
Footballers at the 1924 Summer Olympics
FK Viktoria Žižkov players
People from Louny
Association football forwards
Sportspeople from the Ústí nad Labem Region